Theodorus Bernardus Maria "Theo" Terlingen (26 May 1939 – 1 May 2006) was a field hockey player from the Netherlands. He competed  at the 1960, 1964 and 1968 Summer Olympics where his team finished in ninth, seventh and fifth place, respectively. A defense player, he scored two goals in 1964 and one in 1968.

References

External links
 

1939 births
2006 deaths
Dutch male field hockey players
Field hockey players at the 1960 Summer Olympics
Field hockey players at the 1964 Summer Olympics
Field hockey players at the 1968 Summer Olympics
Olympic field hockey players of the Netherlands
People from Bussum
Sportspeople from North Holland
20th-century Dutch people